Black Hawk and Blackhawk may refer to:

Animals
 Black Hawk (horse), a Morgan horse that lived from 1833 to 1856
 Common black hawk, Buteogallus anthracinus
 Cuban black hawk, Buteogallus gundlachii
 Great black hawk, Buteogallus urubitinga
 Mangrove black hawk, Buteogallus (anthracinus) subtilis

Arts, entertainment, and media

Comics
 Blackhawk (DC Comics), an aviator comic book hero and leader of a team named Blackhawks
 Blackhawk (radio),  a 1950 ABC radio series based on the comic book
 Blackhawk (serial), a 1952 Columbia serial based on the comic book
 Blackhawk (Tornado), a Tornado/2000 AD comic book character
 Blackhawks (DC Comics), a 2011 comic book series

Other uses in arts, entertainment, and media
 Black Hawk Statue, a 1911 statue by Lorado Taft
 Blackhawk (band), a country music band
 Blackhawk (album), an album by Blackhawk
 Blackhawk, a fictional type of spaceship in Peter F. Hamilton's The Night's Dawn Trilogy novels
 Blackthorne or Blackhawk, a 1994 video game

Brands and enterprises
 Blackhawk (tools), a brand of the Stanley Works
 Blackhawk Films, a film distributor
 Blackhawk Network Holdings, an American corporation

Hospitality
 Black Hawk (nightclub), a jazz venue in San Francisco
 Black Hawk Hotel, a hotel in Cedar Falls, Iowa
 Blackhawk (restaurant), a restaurant and supper club first in Chicago and then in Wheeling
 Hotel Blackhawk, a hotel Davenport, Iowa

Military
 86th Infantry Division (United States) or Black Hawk Division
 Curtiss-Wright XF-87 Blackhawk, a prototype jet fighter
 HM-15 "Blackhawks", a U.S. Navy helicopter squadron
 Sikorsky S-67 Blackhawk, a prototype attack helicopter
 Sikorsky UH-60 Black Hawk, a US Army utility helicopter
 USS Black Hawk (1848), a tinclad gunboat 
 USS Black Hawk (AD-9), a Black Hawk-class destroyer tender 1913 to 1947
 USS Black Hawk (MHC-58), an Osprey-class minehunter coastal

People
 Black Hawk (artist) (c. 1832–c. 1890), Sans Arc Lakota artist
 Black Hawk (lacrosse), Native American lacrosse player
 Black Hawk (Sauk leader) (1767–1838), Sauk and Fox leader
 Antonga Black Hawk (c. 1830–1870), Ute leader

Places
 Black Hawk, Colorado, a home rule municipality
 Black Hawk, Kentucky, an unincorporated community
 Black Hawk, Louisiana, an unincorporated community
 Black Hawk, Mississippi, an unincorporated community
 Black Hawk Bridge, a bridge over the Mississippi River between Iowa and Wisconsin
 Black Hawk County, Iowa
 Black Hawk Lake (Sac County, Iowa), a glacial lake
 Black Hawk Purchase, an historical region of Iowa
 Blackhawk, California, an unincorporated community and census-designated place
 Blackhawk, Illinois, an unincorporated community
 Blackhawk, Indiana, an unincorporated town
 Blackhawk, Ohio, an unincorporated community
 Blackhawk, South Dakota, an unincorporated census-designated place
 Blackhawk, West Virginia, an unincorporated community
 Black Hawk, Wisconsin,  an unincorporated community
 Blackhawk Park, Vernon County, Wisconsin

Sports
 Atlanta Blackhawks, a former American soccer team
 Chicago Blackhawks, an American team in the National Hockey League
 Iowa Blackhawks, an American indoor football team now known as the Lincoln Haymakers
 Plattling Black Hawks, an American football club from Plattling, Germany
 San Francisco Bay Blackhawks, a former American soccer team
 Tri-Cities Blackhawks, an American team now known as the Atlanta Hawks
 Waterloo Black Hawks, an American junior hockey team

Transportation
 Black Hawk (Amtrak train), a passenger train between Chicago and Dubuque, Iowa
 Black Hawk (CB&Q train), a former passenger train between Chicago, Illinois, and Minneapolis/St. Paul, Minnesota
 Black Hawk (steamboat), a steamboat built around 1850 and operated in California and Oregon
 Blackhawk (automobile), an automobile manufactured in 1929 and 1930 by the Stutz Motor Car Company in Indianapolis
 Blackhawk, a Carr Special racing aircraft of the 1930s
 Butler Blackhawk 1920s US three-seat utility biplane
 Buick Blackhawk, a retro concept 2+2 convertible built by Buick in 2001
 Stutz Blackhawk, a car manufactured from 1971 through 1987 named for the earlier Stutz car
 USS Black Hawk, the name of several United States military vessels

Other uses
 Black Hawk College, Moline, Illinois
 Ruger Blackhawk, a single-action revolver

See also
 1994 Black Hawk shootdown incident, a friendly fire incident over northern Iraq (different from Black Hawk Down)
 Black Hawk Down (disambiguation)
 Black Hawk War (1832)
 Black Hawk War (1865–1872)